Even is an American financial services company founded in 2015. The company is headquartered in Oakland, California and is known for providing payroll and accounting services including earned wage access.

History 
Even was founded in November 2014 by former CEO Jon Schlossberg and a group of other entrepreneurs. The company raised $1.5 million in seed funding that year, led by tech investor Keith Rabois.

The app entered beta testing in 2015, before becoming available to all users in January 2016.

In 2017, Walmart paid Even an undisclosed amount to begin offering early wage access to its employees.

In July 2018, the company raised $40 million during its Series B round of funding, which was again led by Rabois.

As of 2020, the app had over 500,000 users.

In 2020, PayPal CEO Dan Schulman announced that the company would be partnering with Even to offer the service to its employees as part of its financial wellness initiative.

On March 1, 2021, David Baga became the new CEO of Even, replacing co-founder Jon Schlossberg.

Overview 
The app simulates salaried wages for hourly by calculating average monthly earnings, and offering paid advances based on its algorithm while moving surplus earnings into savings accounts.

References

External links 
 Official website

Financial services companies established in 2014
Financial services companies based in California
Financial technology companies
Earned Wage Access